Mändjala is a village in Saaremaa Parish, Saare County, Estonia, on the island of Saaremaa.

As of 2011 Census, the settlement's population was 161. According to TripAdvisor, there are 3 hotels in Mandjala (the Saaremaa Hotell, Ferienhaus Toikka and Leppaneni) and there are 15 hotels in the Kuressaare area close to Mändjala.

Before the administrative reform in 2017, the village was in Lääne-Saare Parish.

References

Villages in Saare County